Fort Ann may refer to:

Canada
Fort Anne, a fort built to protect the harbour of Annapolis Royal, Nova Scotia, Canada
Siege of Annapolis Royal (1744) or Siege at Fort Anne, in 1744

United States

Fort Ann, California, a former settlement in Amador County, California
Fort Ann, a fort in Brevard County, Florida; see 
Fort Anne (Gloucester, Massachusetts), 1703 fort on the site of later Fort Defiance
Fort Anne (Salem, Massachusetts), 1702 fort on the site of later Fort Pickering
Fort Ann, New York, a town in Washington County, New York
Battle of Fort Anne, an American Revolutionary War battle of July 8, 1777, at Fort Anne, New York
Fort Ann (village), New York, a village in the Town of Fort Ann, New York
Fort Amsterdam, New York City, named Fort Anne for part of its history